Delta Eridani, which is Latinized from δ Eridani, is a star in the equatorial constellation of Eridanus.

The star is visible to the naked eye and has been observed to vary in slightly brightness between magnitudes 3.51 and 3.56, although subsequent observations did not bear this out. It is relatively near to the Sun, with a distance of about 29.5 light years as determined from parallax. The star is drifting closer with a radial velocity of −6 km/s.

Delta Eridani is sometimes called Rana: Rana means "the frog" in Latin, but derivation of this name is uncertain. The name was approved by the International Astronomic Union on 4 April 2022.

Structure
The stellar classification of this star is K0 IV, matching a subgiant star that has exhausted its core hydrogen. This has caused the star to expand and become cooler than a comparable main sequence star. Stellar modelling indicates it is near the end of the subgiant stage and about to transition into a giant. It is an estimated six billion years old with 33% more mass than the Sun. The star has 2.3 times the girth of the Sun and is radiating three times the Sun's luminosity from its photosphere at an effective temperature of 4,986 K.

Delta Eridani is catalogued as a suspected RS Canum Venaticorum variable in 1983, but the activity level for the star is so low that this is considered doubtful. This class of variables occurs in close binary systems. A low projected rotational velocity of under 1 km/s and the lack of radial velocity variation suggests that this putative variable is being viewed from nearly pole-on. However, an examination of the star using interferometry does not detect the presence of a companion at the expected distance.

Chinese name

See also
 List of star systems within 25–30 light-years

References

External links
 
 
 nStars entry

K-type subgiants
Eridani, Delta
Suspected variables

Eridanus (constellation)
Eridani, Delta
BD-10 0728
Eridani, 23
0150
023249
017378
1136
Rana